Syndromodes is a genus of moths in the family Geometridae.

Species include:
 Syndromodes cellulata
 Syndromodes dimensa
 Syndromodes invenusta
 Syndromodes oedocnemis
 Syndromodes prasinops
 Syndromodes unicolor

References

Natural History Museum Lepidoptera genus database

Geometridae